Charles A. Chace (1822 – July 17, 1900) was a politician from Missouri. He served as Mayor of Kansas City in 1880.

Early life
Charles A. Chace was born in 1822 in Columbia County, New York.

Career
In 1860, Chace moved to Kansas City, Missouri. Chace worked as a freight agent for the Chicago, Burlington and Quincy Railroad. He had a grain and feed business in Kansas City. He served on the school board for eleven years. In April 1880, Chace was elected on a Democratic ticket as Mayor of Kansas City. He served for one year. Chace retired from public life and moved to Holley, New York. He then moved to Brighton in Monroe County, New York, in 1898.

Personal life
Chace was a charter member of the Knights Templar in Kansas City. While in Kansas City, Chace lived at 1216 W. 12th Street.

Chace was married. Chace died at his home in Brighton on July 17, 1900.

Legacy
The Chace School in Kansas City, built in 1876, was named after Chace. The school was razed in 1913.

References

External links

1822 births
1900 deaths
People from Columbia County, New York
Mayors of Kansas City, Missouri